Cyperus meeboldii is a species of sedge that is found across India and parts of central and eastern Africa.

The species was first formally described by the botanist Georg Kükenthal in 1922.

See also
 List of Cyperus species

References

meeboldii
Plants described in 1922
Taxa named by Georg Kükenthal
Flora of Africa
Flora of India